Nong Lam University Ho Chi Minh City Viet Nam or Nong Lam University is a comprehensive university in Thủ Đức, Ho Chi Minh City, Vietnam. The university offers 46 majors, such as: Agronomy, Agricultural Engineering, Forestry, Animal Sciences Fisheries, Food Technology, Environmental Science, Foreign Languages, Biological Technology, Economics, and IT, providing both graduate and postgraduate programs.

Faculties
 Faculty of Agriculture
 Faculty of Veterinary Breeding
 Faculty of Forestry
 Faculty of Economics
 Faculty of Engineering and Technology
 Faculty of Fishery
 Faculty of Food Technology
 Faculty of Sciences
 Faculty of Foreign Languages
 Faculty of Environment Technology
 Faculty of Information Technology
 Faculty of Land and Real Estate

Departments
 Department of Politics
 Department of Chemistry Technology
 Department of BioTechnology
 Department of Technical Education

External links
 Official Website of Nong Lam University Ho Chi Minh city Viet nam

Universities in Ho Chi Minh City
Agriculture in Vietnam